Gilla Críst Ua Mucaráin was a bishop in Ireland during the 12th century: 
he was Bishop of Louth  from 1187 until his death in 1191.

References

12th-century Roman Catholic bishops in Ireland
Bishops of Louth
1191 deaths